The Elmwood Cemetery is located at 425 Georges Road in North Brunswick, Middlesex County, New Jersey. It borders New Brunswick, New Jersey. The cemetery was established in 1868.

Notable burials

 John Baillie McIntosh (1829–1888), Union Army brigadier general in the American Civil War
 Charles H. Bell (1798–1875), Rear Admiral in the United States Navy, served during the War of 1812, the Second Barbary War, and the American Civil War
 James Bishop (1816–1895), Opposition Party politician, represented  in the United States House of Representatives from 1855–1857
 Henry de la Bruyere Carpender (1882–1934), of the Hall–Mills murder case
 William Henry Steele Demarest (1863–1956), eleventh President of Rutgers College (now Rutgers University)
 Robert Wood Johnson II (1893–1968), president of Johnson & Johnson
 Frederick Barnett Kilmer (1851–1934), director of Scientific Laboratories for Johnson & Johnson, developed their baby powder, father of Joyce Kilmer
 Joyce Kilmer (1886–1918), who was buried in France, is honored by a cenotaph erected in his family's plot in the cemetery.
 George C. Ludlow (1830–1900), 25th Governor of New Jersey, from 1881–1884
 John Baillie McIntosh (1829–1888), Union Army brigadier general in the American Civil War
 Miles Ross (1827–1903), Mayor of New Brunswick, represented New Jersey's 3rd congressional district in the United States House of Representatives from 1875–1883
 Rev. Samuel Merrill Woodbridge, D.D., LL.D. (1819–1905), Reformed clergyman, professor at Rutgers College (1857–1864) and New Brunswick Theological Seminary (1857–1901), led the seminary (1883–1901)

Gallery

References

External links 
 
 Elmwood Cemetery at The Political Graveyard

Cemeteries in Middlesex County, New Jersey
North Brunswick, New Jersey